is a Japanese politician from the Constitutional Democratic Party and a former trade union leader. He currently serves as members of the House of Councillors being elected from the National Representation list in 2010.

His father Daikichi Ishibashi was a member of the House of Representatives.

References

1965 births
Living people
People from Shimane Prefecture
Members of the House of Councillors (Japan)
Constitutional Democratic Party of Japan politicians
Democratic Party of Japan politicians
Japanese trade unionists